Losevo may refer to:
Losevo, Leningrad Oblast, a village in Leningrad Oblast, Russia
Losevo, Semiluksky District, Voronezh Oblast, a village in the Semiluksky District of Voronezh Oblast, Russia
Losevo, name of several other rural localities in Russia